Gerberding Hall (formerly known as the Administration Building) is a building on the campus of the University of Washington in Seattle, United States.

History
The Administration Building was built in 1949 to house the University of Washington's administrative offices and was the first major structure erected on campus following World War II. Constructed from a design by Victor N. Jones and John T. Jacobsen, it was built at a cost of $1,561,924.

In 1995, the Administration Building was renamed Gerberding Hall in honor of former university president William Gerberding. As of 2017, the building houses the office of the university's president.

Design

Located abutting Red Square, and constructed entirely of cast stone, Gerberding Hall is built in the collegiate Gothic style with its characteristic elements including gargoyles, pointed arches, towers, and gabled roofs. Along its parapets are 25 sculptures by Dudley Pratt representing different academic disciplines; for example, a figure of the god Neptune on the building's east gable is intended to represent oceanography and fisheries science. The structure is dominated by a central, square tower. On the face of each of its sides is engraved the keys of Phi Beta Kappa. The tower itself, originally intended to serve as a belfry, did not fulfill that purpose until 2008. In that year, a set of eight bells – the Gordon Stuart Peek Foundation Memorial Bells – was installed which were designed to be operated by change ringing. A shield bearing the visage of Herbert Condon in relief and the words "Friend of Youth" sits over the exterior doorway to the tower. 

Other sculptures on the building's exterior include a Siberian Husky and a man wearing academic gowns holding an adding machine and a money bag.

The interior consists of two, three-story wings set at different ground levels, hinged at the central tower.

Gallery

Notes

References

University of Washington campus
Collegiate Gothic architecture
Buildings and structures in Seattle
1949 establishments in Washington (state)